Häringe Castle  (Häringe slott) is a former manor house in  Södermanland, Sweden. It is located about 35 km south of Stockholm and lies within the Häringe-Hammersta Nature Reserve.

History
The current main building was built on the initiative of Gustav Horn, Count of Pori  (1592–1657) and was completed in 1657.
After Gustaf Horn's death, the manor was inherited by their daughter Agneta Horn (1629–1672).
Häringe was inherited by Agneta Horn's granddaughter Agneta Wrede in 1696 and in 1730 by her daughter Hedvig Catharina De la Gardie (1695–1745) wife of 
Magnus Julius De la Gardie. In 1745 it was acquired by their youngest son of Count Carl Julius De la Gardie (1729–1786). The property was purchased in 1769 by Major General Fabian Löwen (1699–1773).

In the 1930s, the castle was renovated and modernized by engineer and industrialist Torsten Kreuger (1884–1973). 
Since 2017, the facility has been owned by businessman  Veselin Vesko Mijač, who operates it as a hotel and conference center.

See also
List of castles and manor houses in Sweden
Södermanland Runic Inscription 239

References

External links
Häringe slott Hotell  website

 Buildings and structures in Södermanland County
Manor houses in Sweden